Reza Khan (died October 8, 2007) was charged on August 5, 2004 in Kabul, Afghanistan of murder, rape, and robbery involving four journalists on November 19, 2001. Khan was also accused of cutting off the noses and ears of four Afghan men due to their short beards. Khan was convicted in November 2004 and executed in Afghanistan on October 8, 2007. Khan also confessed to killing his own wife in Pakistan.

The journalists (Harry Burton, Maria Grazia Cutuli, Azizullah Haidari and Julio Fuentes) were traveling in a convoy from Jalalabad to Kabul when a group of armed men dragged them from their cars and murdered them.

Khan confessed to being one of 11 people who stopped the vehicles, and to personally killing one of the foreign men and raping Cutuli; he said they got their orders from Taliban leader Maulawi Latif.

See also 
Rape in Afghanistan

References 

2007 deaths
21st-century executions by Afghanistan
Afghan Islamists
Afghan people convicted of murder
Afghan people convicted of rape
Executed Afghan people
Executed Afghan serial killers
Executed mass murderers
Male serial killers
Mass murder in Afghanistan
Muslims with branch missing
People executed by Afghanistan by firing squad
People executed for murder
People convicted of murder by Afghanistan
People convicted of robbery
Uxoricides
Year of birth missing